The 1996 Family Circle Cup was a women's tennis tournament played on outdoor clay courts at the Sea Pines Plantation on Hilton Head Island, South Carolina in the United States that was part of Tier I of the 1996 WTA Tour. It was the 24th edition of the tournament and was held from April 1 through April 7, 1996. Second-seeded Arantxa Sánchez Vicario won the singles title.

Finals

Singles

 Arantxa Sánchez Vicario defeated  Barbara Paulus 6–2, 2–6, 6–2
 It was Sánchez Vicario's 3rd title of the year and the 65th of her career.

Doubles

 Jana Novotná /  Arantxa Sánchez Vicario defeated  Gigi Fernández /  Mary Joe Fernández 6–2, 6–3
 It was Novotná's 3rd title of the year and the 69th of her career. It was Sánchez Vicario's 4th title of the year and the 66th of her career.

References

External links
 ITF tournament edition details

Family Circle Cup
Charleston Open
Family Circle Cup
Family Circle Cup
Family Circle Cup